The Embassy of North Korea in Mexico City is the diplomatic mission of North Korea to Mexico, located in the capital Mexico City.

List of representatives

See also
Mexico–North Korea relations

References

Mexico–North Korea relations
North Korea
Mexico City
Buildings and structures in Mexico City